Hans Eich (born 17 May 1949) is a West German sprint canoer who competed in the mid-1970s. At the 1976 Summer Olympics in Montreal, he was eliminated in the semifinals of both the K-1 500 m and the K-1 1000 m events.

References
Sports-reference.com profile

1949 births
Canoeists at the 1976 Summer Olympics
German male canoeists
Living people
Olympic canoeists of West Germany